The 1972 Campeonato Nacional de Fútbol Profesional, was the 40st season of top-flight football in Chile. Colo-Colo won their eleventh title following a 1–1 draw against Huachipato in the championship 33rd matchday on December 16, 1972, also qualifying to the 1973 Copa Libertadores.

League table

Results

Top goalscorers

References

External links
ANFP 

Primera División de Chile seasons
Chile
Prim